Paul Charlier is an Australian composer and sound designer who works primarily in theatre and film. He has also worked in radio and was a founding member of the Sydney post-punk band SoliPsiK. His theatre work includes the Sydney Theatre Company productions of A Streetcar Named Desire (Sound Designer) and Uncle Vanya (Composer and Sound Designer), as well as the Company B productions of  Faith Healer (Composer) and The Diary of a Madman (Sound Designer). His film credits include The Final Quarter (Composer), Looking for Alibrandi (Sound Designer), Candy (Composer and Sound Designer), Paul Kelly - Stories of Me (Sound Designer) and Last Ride (Composer).

Awards and nominations

Film
The Final Quarter (2019)
Paul Kelly - Stories of Me (2012)  Winner 2013 Australian Screen Sound Guild Best Sound for a Documentary. 
Paul Kelly - Stories of Me (2012)  Nominated AACTA Award for Best Sound in a Documentary.
 Candy - Nominated for a 2006 FCCA Award (Best Music Score)
 The Projectionist - Nominated (with Ian McLoughlin) for a 2003 AFI Award (Best Sound in a Non-Feature Film)

Theatre
 The Diary of a Madman - Won (with Alan John) a 2010 Sydney Theatre Award (Best Score or Sound Design)
 A Streetcar Named Desire - Won a 2009 Sydney Theatre Award (Best Score or Sound Design) and a 2010 Helpmann Award (Best Sound Design)
 Buried Child - Nominated for a 2003 Helpmann Award (Best Sound Design)

Physical theatre
 Honour Bound - Won a 2006 Sydney Theatre Award (Best Score or Sound Design) and a 2006 Greenroom Award (Outstanding Composition/Sound Design)

Body of work

Film
The Comedian Dir. Ian Darling. Featuring Greg Fleet. (2020)
The Final Quarter Dir. Ian Darling. (2019) Shark Island Productions
 Suzy & The Simple Man - Dir. Ian Darling, Jon Muir, Suzan Muir (2016) Shark Island Productions
 Holding the Man (film) - Dir. Neil Armfield. (2015)
 Paul Kelly - Stories of Me - Dir. Ian Darling (2012) Shark Island Productions
 Last Ride - Dir. Glendyn Innis. (2009)
 Candy - Dir. Neil Armfield. (2006)
 The Cost of Living - Dir. Lloyd Newson. (2005)
 The Projectionist - Dir. Michael Bates. (2003)
 Looking for Alibrandi - Dr Kate Woods. (2000)
 Aftershocks - Dir. Geoff Burton. (1998)
 Amongst Equals - Dir. Tom Zubrycki. (1991)
 Friends and Enemies - Dir. Tom Zubrycki. (1987)

Theatre - original music and sound design
Prima Facie - Dir: Lee Lewis. Griffin Theatre Company (2019)
The Dance of Death - Dir: Judy Davis. Belvoir St Theatre (2018)
Faith Healer - Dir: Judy Davis. Belvoir St Theatre (2016)
 Uncle Vanya -  Dir: Tamas Ascher. Sydney Theatre Company. (2010)
 Tot Mom - Dir: Steven Soderbergh. Sydney Theatre Company. (2009)
 A Streetcar Named Desire - Dir: Liv Ullmann, Sydney Theatre Company. (2009)
 Afterlife - Dir: Michael Blakemore. Royal National Theatre. (2008)
 Toy Symphony - Dir: Neil Armfield. Company B. (2007)
 Influence - Dir: Bruce Myles, Sydney Theatre Company. (2005)
 Victory - Dir: Judy Davis with Ben Winspear. Sydney Theatre Company. (2004)
 The Lieutenant of Inishmore - Dir: Neil Armfield. Company B. (2003)
 The Way of the World - Dir: Gale Edwards. Sydney Theatre Company. (2003)
 Buried Child - Dir: Gale Edwards. Company B. (2002)
 Suddenly Last Summer - Dir: Neil Armfield. Company B. (2000)
 The Seagull - Dir: Neil Armfield. Company B. (1997)
 The Blind Giant Is Dancing - Dir: Neil Armfield. Company B. (1995)
 Aftershocks - Dir: Neil Armfield. Company B. (1993)

Theatre - sound design
 The Diary of a Madman - Dir: Neil Armfield. Company B. (2010)
 Deuce - Dir: Michael Blakemore. Music Box Theatre. (2007)
 Ying Tong - Dir: Richard Cottrell. Sydney Theatre Company. (2007)
 Hedda Gabler - Dir: Robyn Nevin. Sydney Theatre Company. (2006)
 The Real Thing - Dir: Robyn Nevin. Sydney Theatre Company. (2003)
 Waiting For Godot - Dir: Neil Armfield. Company B. (2003)
 Copenhagen - Dir: Michael Blakemore. Sydney Theatre Company. (2002)
 The Judas Kiss - Dir: Neil Armfield. Company B and The Festival Of Sydney. (1999)
 Night On Bald Mountain - Dir: Neil Armfield. Company B. (1997)
 Hamlet - Dir: Neil Armfield. Company B. (1994)

Physical theatre and dance - original score and sound design
 Jurrungu Ngan-ga/Straight Talk  - Chr: Dalisa Pigram with the performers Dir: Rachael Swain. Marrugeku and Carriageworks (2022)
 Honour Bound - Dir: Nigel Jamieson, Chr: Garry Stewart. Sydney Opera House and Malthouse Theatre. (2006)
 Already Elsewhere - Chr: Kate Champion. Force Majeure and Sydney Festival. (2005)
 DV8: The Cost Of Living / Can We Afford This? - Dir/Chr: Lloyd Newson. DV8 Physical Theatre. (2000)
 Blood Vessel - Dir: Rachael Swain. Stalker Theatre Company. (1998)

Radio features - script and music
 E-Dice: A Plan For Eurydice - Commissioned by ABC Radio. (1991)
 A Fall - Commissioned by ABC Radio. (1991)
 The Touring Machine - Commissioned by The Museum of Contemporary Art, Los Angeles. Co-produced by ABC Radio. (1989)
 Remembrance Day - ABC Radio 'Surface Tension'. (1985)

Discography

Soundtracks
 Last Ride OST - Level 2 Music. (2009)
 Candy OST - Inertia. (2006)

SoliPsiK
 See Saw (single track) on Can’t Stop It 2 – Australian Post Punk 1979-84 (compilation), Chapter Music. (2006)
 Leichenschrei (1982)
 Zombod (single track) on "A Sampler" (compilation), M-Squared Records. (1982)
 See Saw (single), M-Squared Records. (1981)

Other
 The Touring Machine - The Museum of Contemporary Art, Los Angeles. (1990)

Notes

References

Other reading
''Faith Healer" at Belvoir
 Sonic Boom, The Australian
 Volley Up by Brian Reesman in Stage Directions USA

External links
 Paul Kelly The Movie
Paul Charlier found on SoundCloud

Year of birth missing (living people)
Living people
Sound designers
Australian film score composers
Male film score composers